Kerouna is a town in Driouch Province of the Oriental administrative region of Morocco. According to the 2004 census, it has a population of 2188.

References

Populated places in Oriental (Morocco)